Psalidognathus modestus is a species of beetle belonging to the family Cerambycidae.

Description
The surface is shining and the basic colour is black or dark brown. The head is spiny and the mandibles are very large.

Distribution
This species can be found in Colombia, Costa Rica, Ecuador, Panama and Venezuela.

References
 Global Species
 Encyclopedia of Life

Prioninae
Beetles described in 1833